Horama diffissa is a moth in the family Erebidae first described by Augustus Radcliffe Grote in 1866. It is found in Cuba and Haiti.

The wingspan is about 33 mm for males and 38–44 mm for females. The forewings are tawny, with an ochreous-yellow spot at the humeral angle. The hindwings are ochreous yellow with a tawny band across the apex and termen.

References

Moths described in 1866
Euchromiina